Manzana, a Spanish word meaning "apple" or "city block", may refer to:

 Manzana (album), a 2004 album by Los Prisioneros
 Manzana (unit), a city block
 Manzana, San Jose, a barangay of San Jose, Camarines Sur, Philippines
 Manzana verde, an alcoholic beverage

See also
 Las Manzanas River, Guatemala
 Manzanal (disambiguation)